The Winter Hexagon or Winter Circle/Oval is an asterism appearing to be in the form of a hexagon with vertices at Rigel, Aldebaran, Capella, Pollux, Procyon, and Sirius. It is mostly upon the Northern Hemisphere's celestial sphere. On most locations on Earth (except the South Island of New Zealand and the south of Chile and Argentina and further south), this asterism is prominently in the sky from approximately December to March. In the tropics and southern hemisphere, this (then called "summer hexagon") can be extended with the bright star Canopus in the south.

Smaller and more regularly shaped is the Winter Triangle, an approximately equilateral triangle that shares two vertices (Sirius and Procyon) with the larger asterism. The third vertex is Betelgeuse, which lies near the center of the hexagon. These three stars are three of the ten brightest objects, as viewed from Earth, outside the Solar System. Betelgeuse is also particularly easy to locate, being a shoulder of Orion, which assists stargazers in finding the triangle.  Once the triangle is located, the larger hexagon may then be found.

Several of the stars in the hexagon may also be found independently of one another by following various lines traced through various stars in Orion.

The stars in the hexagon are parts of six constellations.  Counter-clockwise around the hexagon, starting with Rigel, these are Orion, Taurus, Auriga, Gemini, Canis Minor, and Canis Major.

See also
Spring Triangle
Summer Triangle
Northern Cross

References

External links
 The Great Winter Hexagon
 APOD 2011 January 3 Winter Hexagon Over Stagecoach Colorado

Asterisms (astronomy)